Indi may refer to:
Mag-indi language
Division of Indi, an electoral division in the Australian House of Representatives
Indi, Karnataka, a town in the state of Karnataka, India
Instrument Neutral Distributed Interface, a distributed control system with particular focus in astronomical instrumentation
 Parish of Indi, New South Wales

See also
Indie (disambiguation)
Indy (disambiguation)